Scagnello is a comune (municipality) in the Province of Cuneo in the Italian region Piedmont, located about  southeast of Turin and about  east of Cuneo.

Scagnello borders the following municipalities: Battifollo, Ceva, Lisio, Mombasiglio, and Monasterolo Casotto. It belongs to the villages of Val Mongia.

Scagnello means "Customs". Scagnello was a cornerstone on the Old Salt Route from Genoa to Milan. Most of its richness was destroyed during the Napoleonic phase of occupation and destruction. Only old ruins of castles document the prior power. Currently an old house still exists which has a catalogued fresco from the 15th century.

Demographic evolution

References

Cities and towns in Piedmont
Comunità Montana Valli Mongia, Cevetta e Langa Cebana